Lecidea is a genus of crustose lichens with a carbon black ring or outer margin (exciple) around the fruiting body disc (apothecium), usually (or always) found growing on (saxicolous) or in (endolithic) rock. Lichens that have such a black exciple are called lecideine, meaning "like Lecidea, even if they are not in this genus. Members of the genus are commonly called disk lichens or tile lichens.

Selected species

According to the Dictionary of the Fungi (10th edition, 2008), the widespread genus contains an estimated 427 species.

 Lecidea atrobrunnea
 Lecidea hassei
 Lecidea keimioeensis
 Lecidea laboriosa
 Lecidea lithophila

References

Lecideales genera
Lichen genera
Taxa named by Erik Acharius
Lecideales
Taxa described in 1803